Groothuis is a Dutch surname. Notable people with the surname include:

Bart Groothuis (born 1981), Dutch politician
Douglas Groothuis (born 1957), American Christian theologian
Gregg Groothuis (born 1970), American professional wrestler
Paul Groothuis, Dutch sound designer
Stefan Groothuis (born 1981), Dutch speed skater

Dutch-language surnames